Tai Wan or Tai Wan Village is a village in Sai Kung District, Hong Kong.

Administration
Tai Wan is a recognized village under the New Territories Small House Policy.

References

External links

 Delineation of area of existing village Tai Wan (Sai Kung) for election of resident representative (2019 to 2022)

Villages in Sai Kung District, Hong Kong